Warren Morton Washington (born August 28, 1936) is an American atmospheric scientist, a former chair of the National Science Board, and currently senior scientist at the National Center for Atmospheric Research (NCAR) in Boulder, Colorado.

Biography 
Washington was born in Portland, Oregon. He graduated from Oregon State University (OSU) with a B. S. in physics and an M.S. in meteorology, and obtained a doctoral degree in meteorology from Pennsylvania State University (PSU) in 1964. He joined the National Center for Atmospheric Research (NCAR) in 1963 as a scientist and then moved through the ranks to become senior scientist in 1975.

Washington is an internationally recognized expert in atmospheric sciences and climate research specializing in computer modeling of the Earth's climate. In recent years he has served his science in a broad range of capacities. He was appointed to the National Science Board (NSB) in 1994, reappointed in 2000, and became chair from 2002–2006. In 1998 he was appointed to the National Oceanic and Atmospheric Administration (NOAA) Science Advisory Board; in 1999 he was elected by the Woods Hole Oceanographic Institution (WHOI) Board of Trustees as a member of the corporation for a three-year term; in 2000 he was appointed a member of the Advanced Scientific Computing Advisory Committee by the U.S. Secretary of Energy; and in February 2009 he was elected to the National Academy of Engineering (NAE) "for pioneering the development of coupled climate models, their use on parallel supercomputing architectures, and their interpretation." His scientific and policy papers are archived as the Warren M. Washington Collection at the library of the National Center for Atmospheric Research.

He has also garnered numerous awards. Among these, the U.S. Department of Energy awarded Washington the Biological and Environmental Research Program Exceptional Service Award for Atmospheric Science in 1997, for the development and application of advanced coupled atmospheric-ocean general circulation models (GCMs) to study the impacts of human activities on future climate. Also in 1997 he was inducted into the Portrait Collection of African Americans in Science, Engineering, and Medicine of the National Academy of Sciences (NAS).

In 1999 Washington received the National Weather Service (NWS) Modernization Award. In January 2000 Washington was given the Charles Anderson Award from the American Meteorological Society (AMS) for pioneering efforts as a mentor and passionate supporter of individuals, educational programs, and outreach initiatives designed to foster a diverse population of atmospheric scientists. Also he is an honorary member and past-President of the AMS. In March 2000 Washington received the Celebrating 20th Century Pioneers in Atmospheric Sciences Award at Howard University and in April 2000 Colorado's Bonfils-Stanton Foundation Award in recognition of significant and unique contributions in the field of science. He is a fellow of the American Philosophical Society (APS), and he has received honorary doctorates from Oregon State University and Bates College. In 2009 he was elected as a fellow of the American Academy of Arts and Sciences (AAAS). On October 15, 2010, President Barack Obama named Washington one of 10 eminent researchers to be awarded the National Medal of Science. In February 2019 Washington was awarded the Tyler Prize for Environmental Achievement, alongside Michael E. Mann. Washington gave the 2019 Ambrose Jearld Jr. sponsored by the Woods Hole Diversity Initiative.

Personal life
Washington is the grandfather of professional soccer player Reggie Cannon.

Publication
 Washington, Warren M; Washington, Mary C (2008). "Odyssey in Climate Modelling, Global Warming, and Advising Five Presidents".
Washington, Warren M; Parkinson, Claire L. (2005). "An Introduction to Three-dimensional Climate Modelling".
Hu, Aixue; Xu, Yangyang; Tebaldi, Claudia et al. (2013). "Mitigation of short-lived climate pollutants slow sea-level rise".

References

External links 
 NCAR Library and Archives Warren M. Washington Special Collection
NCRA UCAR, CCR People, Warren Washington, Senior Scientist 
 UCAR Digital Image Library photo, portrait of Warren Washington
 UCAR Digital Image Library photo, Warren Washington and NCAR intern
 Warren Washington Oral History Interview
 

Living people
Scientists from Portland, Oregon
1936 births
African-American scientists
Oregon State University alumni
Penn State College of Earth and Mineral Sciences alumni
Members of the United States National Academy of Engineering
American climatologists
National Center for Atmospheric Research faculty
African-American history of Oregon
21st-century African-American people
20th-century African-American people